Central diabetes insipidus, also called neurogenic diabetes insipidus, is a type of diabetes insipidus due to a lack of vasopressin (ADH) production in the brain.  Vasopressin acts to increase the volume of blood (intravascularly), and decrease the volume of urine produced. Therefore, a lack of it causes increased urine production and volume depletion.

It is also known as neurohypophyseal diabetes insipidus, referring to the posterior pituitary (neurohypophysis), which is supplied by the hypothalamus in the brain. This condition has only polyuria in common with diabetes. Although not mutually exclusive, with most typical cases, the name diabetes insipidus is a misleading misnomer. A better name might be "hypothalamic-neurohypophyseal ADH deficiency".

Signs and symptoms

Increased thirst, polyuria and dehydration with metabolic encephalopathy.

Causes

Unknown
In at least 25% of cases (the most commonly occurring classification), neurogenic diabetes insipidus is of unknown cause, meaning that the lack of vasopressin production arose from an unknown cause.
It is also due to damage of the hypothalamus, pituitary stalk, posterior pituitary, and can arise from head trauma.

Acquired
The lack of vasopressin production usually results from some sort of damage to the pituitary gland. It may be due to damage to the brain caused by:
 Benign suprasellar tumors (20% of cases)
 Infections (encephalitis, tuberculosis, etc.)
 Trauma (17% of cases) or neurosurgery (9% of cases)
 Non-infectious granuloma (sarcoidosis, Langerhans cell histiocytosis etc.)
 Leukaemia
 Autoimmune - associated with thyroiditis
 Other rare causes which include hemochromatosis and histiocytosis.

Vasopressin is released by the posterior pituitary, but unlike most other pituitary hormones, vasopressin is produced in the hypothalamus. Neurogenic diabetes insipidus can be a failure of production at the hypothalamus, or a failure of release at the pituitary.

Genetic
The most rare form of central DI is familial neurogenic diabetes insipidus.  This form of DI is due to an inherited mutation of the arginine vasopressin-neurophysin II (AVP-NPII) gene, inherited in an autosomal dominant manner.  At one point, only 45 families worldwide were known to possess this genetic trait.  It is now more widely recognized, although the precise number of people affected with this form of DI is unknown at the present time.

There is also an X-linked familial form. Wolfram syndrome (also called DIDMOAD) is characterised by diabetes mellitus, sensorineural deafness, and optic atrophy.

Diagnosis
In many respects, the diagnosis of central diabetes insipidus begins as a diagnosis of exclusion. Specifically, other more common causes of polyuria and polydipsia are ruled out. Common rule outs include: diabetes mellitus, chronic kidney disease, hypokalemia, hypercalcemia, and psychogenic polydipsia. Once these conditions have been ruled out a water deprivation test is employed to confirm the diagnosis of CDI.

Treatment
The disorder is treated with vasopressin analogs such as desmopressin. Nonetheless, many times desmopressin alone is not enough to bring under control all the symptoms, and another intervention must be implemented.

See also
 Fluid deprivation test

References

External links 

Hypothalamus disorders
Pituitary disorders